The Albion Precinct is a now-defunct precinct in Edwards County, Illinois. It was home to Albion, Illinois, the county's seat. Albion Precinct was split up into Albion No. 1 Precinct, Albion No. 2 Precinct, and Albion No. 3 Precinct.

References

External links
Edwards County, Illinois

Precincts in Edwards County, Illinois